Futebol Feminino do Famalicão, commonly known as Famalicão, is a women's football club from Vila Nova de Famalicão, in Braga District, Portugal. The team, a section of F.C. Famalicão, was founded in 2019 and promoted to the top tier Campeonato Nacional Feminino in 2020. The women's team plays home games at the club's 500-capacity Academia do F.C. Famalicão training facility.

The sale of Mylena Freitas to Shanghai Shengli in May 2021 for €50,000 represented a Portuguese national record transfer fee for a female player. In July 2021 the club appointed former Brazil women's national football team coach Jorge Barcellos.

Players

Current squad

Former players

References

External links

Women
Women's football clubs in Portugal
Association football clubs established in 2019
2019 establishments in Portugal
Campeonato Nacional de Futebol Feminino teams